Anderson, Forster and Wilcox were a practice of London architects, who were partially responsible for the modernist Daily Mirror building (1961–1994) in Holborn Circus and the six-storey Chester Court apartment block in Lissenden Gardens.

References

Architecture firms based in London